Charlotte Summers (born 15 November 2005) is a Spanish singer and dancer. Originally from Marbella, Spain, she made her first stage appearance with a dance act in Les Misérables, at the age of eight. A year later, she competed in the talent show series La Voz. At the age of ten, she was the runner up in the second season of Fenómeno Fan, and the winner of the Big Talent Competition.

She won the Original Song Contest at the Eurokids International, Italy, in 2017, with her song Unicorn.
In 2018, she traveled to the United States.
She appeared on NBC's Little Big Shots twice. At age 13 in 2019 she appeared on America's Got Talent (season 14).

Career

2018: Little Big Shots
When she was 11 years old, she appeared on Little Big Shots twice:

 April 2018 where she sat for an interview with Steve Harvey and then sang "It's a Man's Man's Man's World".
 December 2018 where she sat for an interview with Steve Harvey and then she sang "Please Come Home For Christmas"

2019: America's Got Talent (AGT)
Soul-blues singer Charlotte Summers appeared on America's Got Talent Season 14 (2019) 3 times at age 13.

Audition

In the first round, she received a standing ovation from the audience and all 4 judges for her rendition of Screamin' Jay Hawkins' "I Put a Spell on You".

Judge Cuts

For the judge cuts Charlotte performed her own rendition of "You Don't Own Me" recorded by Lesley Gore in 1963. Her performance received a standing ovation from the audience, the 4 judges, and the guest judge Jay Leno, and they advanced her to the quarterfinals.

Quarterfinals

Her quarterfinals performance consisted of singing Shirley Bassey's "Diamonds Are Forever" from the James Bond film of the same name. Due to her placement in America's Vote, the number of votes she received in the Dunkin' Save and the judges voting, she was forced into a tiebreaker where she was eventually eliminated from the competition.

Stage performances

References

External links
Official website
Charlotte Summers on IMDb

Living people
2005 births
21st-century Spanish women singers
21st-century Spanish singers
People from Marbella
America's Got Talent contestants